King–Dennis Farm is a historic home and farm located in Center Township, Wayne County, Indiana. The farmhouse was built about 1840, and is a large two-story, brick I-house. Also on the property are the contributing summer kitchen (c. 1910), poultry house (c. 1910), small barn (c. 1910), livestock barn (c. 1870), milk house (c. 1925), and an equipment barn.

It was added to the National Register of Historic Places in 2000.

References

Farms on the National Register of Historic Places in Indiana
Houses completed in 1840
Buildings and structures in Wayne County, Indiana
National Register of Historic Places in Wayne County, Indiana